"Let Her Cry" is a song by American rock band Hootie & the Blowfish. It was released in December 1994 as the second single from their debut album, Cracked Rear View, and became a top-10 hit in Australia, Canada, Iceland, and the United States. The song received the Grammy Award for Best Pop Performance by a Duo or Group with Vocals in 1996.

Origins
In 2008, lead singer Darius Rucker recalled that he had just listened to the song "She Talks to Angels" by the Black Crowes for the first time and was listening to a record by blues singer Bonnie Raitt and "in one stream of consciousness" wrote the lyrics to the song.

Chart performance
The single reached the number-two position on the US Billboard Pop Songs chart and number nine on the Billboard Hot 100. It also peaked at number two on the Canadian RPM Top Singles Chart and number four on the Australian Singles Chart.

Music video
The music video was directed by Adolfo Doring. The video was shot in a sepia tone and features the band singing the song intercut with a woman who runs around a city in the rain.

Track listings

US maxi-CD single
 "Let Her Cry" (radio edit) – 4:12
 "Fine Line" – 3:29
 "Almost Home" – 3:58
 "Let Her Cry" (LP version) – 5:09

US cassette single
 "Let Her Cry" (radio edit)
 "Let Her Cry" (LP version)

Australian CD and cassette single
 "Let Her Cry" (radio edit) – 4:12
 "Let Her Cry" (LP version) – 5:09
 "Where Were You" – 3:50
 "Fine Line" – 3:30

German CD1
 "Let Her Cry" (LP version) – 5:07
 "Hannah Jane" (live version) – 4:05
 "Where Were You" – 3:51
 "Fine Line" – 3:30

German CD2
 "Let Her Cry" (edit) – 4:10
 "Goodbye" (live version) – 4:11
 "The Ballad of John and Yoko" (live) – 3:45
 "Hold My Hand" (live version) – 5:47

Charts

Weekly charts

Year-end charts

Certifications

References

1994 singles
1994 songs
Atlantic Records singles
Black-and-white music videos
Hootie & the Blowfish songs
Song recordings produced by Don Gehman
Songs written by Darius Rucker
Songs written by Jim Sonefeld
Songs written by Mark Bryan